Concord Township, Kansas may refer to:

 Concord Township, Ford County, Kansas
 Concord Township, Ottawa County, Kansas

See also 
 List of Kansas townships
 Concord Township (disambiguation)

Kansas township disambiguation pages